The Mercy of God is a 1961 novel by the French writer Jean Cau. It tells the story of four murderers—a doctor, a boxer, a workman and a gambler—who share a prison cell and tell their respective stories. An English translation by Richard Howard was published in 1963.

The novel was awarded the Prix Goncourt.

Reception
Hans Koningsberger of The Saturday Review called the book "a splendid novel", and wrote: "The tradition of the book is very Sartrian and very French[.] Cau has continued and greatly contributed to this pattern rather than emulated it. The formula may sound pat, the book is fresh and original." The critic continued: "I objected, at least in this translation, to the similarity in speech between four men of such vastly different background, but, apart from that—a minor point—this novel deserves nothing but praise."

References

External links
 Publicity page at Éditions Gallimard's website

1961 French novels
French-language novels
Novels set in prison
Prix Goncourt winning works